WZKX (107.9 FM, "Kicker 108") is a hot country music formatted radio station based in Gulfport–Biloxi-Bay Saint Louis, Mississippi. The station is owned by Coast Radio Group, Inc., and it  broadcasts with an ERP of 100,000 watts and is a Class C station.
As of March 1, 2023 WZKX FM is now broadcasting in HD radio.

History
In the early 1980s WZKX was one of the only AOR radio stations on the Gulf Coast. With the station located in Orange Grove - just north of Gulfport Mississippi, many of the "redneck rockers" relied on "Rock 107" to play heavier album tracks from Boston to Rush.  A "Power Rock Song" at the top of the hour was the only requirement for most of the FM Air personalities.

Just like the plot in the 1978 movie "FM", management brought in tapes and playlists and by 1982 free form AOR disappeared (along with some talent like late night's DJ Jeff Davis, though Mark "In the Middle" McGraw remained.)

In early 1987, WZKX started broadcasting at its  tower in McHenry, Mississippi, and became a Top 40 hits outlet as Power 108 for South Mississippi until a 1994 switch to country as Kicker 108.

The original Power 108 airstaff was Brian Rhodes mornings, with the late Dave Melton, Sr. doing news, Mark McCraw doing middays (Mark in the Middle), P.D. The Real Rick James doing afternoons, and Mark ("The Top Gun") Gunn doing nights. Reverend Red (Collins Powell) did late nights.

As of March 1, 2023. WZKX is now broadcasting HD radio with three HD channels includes Kicker 108 (Country) on 107.9 HD1, The Quake (Classic Rock) on 107.9 HD2, and The Hype (Hip-pop) on 107.9 HD3.

Signal
WZKX's upgraded  tower with a 100,000-watt signal can reach east to Mobile, Alabama, west to New Orleans, Louisiana, and north to Laurel, Mississippi. Also broadcasting in HD radio.

External links
Kicker 108 WZKX official website
107.9 HD3 The Hype official website

ZKX
Country radio stations in the United States